Turned Up is a 1924 American silent drama film directed by James Chapin and starring Charles Hutchison, Mary Beth Milford and Crauford Kent.

Synopsis
A young bank teller is really an agent of the Department of Justice working undercover to expose a crooked bank president and the gang he is in cahoots with.

Cast
 Charles Hutchison as Bruce Pomroy
 Mary Beth Milford as 	Betty Brownee
 Crauford Kent as Paul Gilmore
 Otto Lederer as John Creighton
 Betty Morrissey as 	Lola 
 Charles Cruz as Joe Turner
 Charles Force as Tom Martin

References

Bibliography
 Katchmer, George A. A Biographical Dictionary of Silent Film Western Actors and Actresses. McFarland, 2015.
 Munden, Kenneth White. The American Film Institute Catalog of Motion Pictures Produced in the United States, Part 1. University of California Press, 1997.

External links
 

1924 films
1924 drama films
1920s English-language films
American silent feature films
Silent American drama films
American black-and-white films
Films directed by James Chapin
1920s American films